Cajun Beat (March 26, 2000 – January 18, 2020) was an American Thoroughbred racehorse best known for winning the 2003 Breeders' Cup Sprint at 25–1. Owned by Padua Stables and John & Joseph Iracane, Cajun Beat retired from racing in April 2005 having won seven of nineteen starts and with earnings of $1,159,100.

References

External links
 Cajun Beat's pedigree and partial racing stats

2000 racehorse births
Racehorses bred in Kentucky
Racehorses trained in the United States
Breeders' Cup Sprint winners
Thoroughbred family 1-k
2020 racehorse deaths